= Halenda =

Village in Gujarat, India

Coordinates: 22.088185°N 71.05171°E

Halenda is a village in Gujarat, India.

== Geography ==
Halenda's altitude is 197 meters (649 feet).

== Postal code ==
The postal code is 360032.
